On Guard may refer to:

Film and television
 On Guard (serial), a 1927 film serial
 On Guard (1984 film), an Australian film of 1984
 On Guard (1997 film), a French swashbuckler film
 "On Guard" (White Collar), a 2011 TV episode

Other uses
 On Guard, a 1903 novel by Upton Sinclair
 "On Guard", a 2021 song by Lauren Jauregui
 "On Guard", a 2001 song by Le Tigre from Feminist Sweepstakes

See also
 En garde (disambiguation)